J. Maurice Hamilton (March 4, 1923 – June 24, 1976) was a Canadian politician, who represented Renfrew North in the Legislative Assembly of Ontario from 1955 to 1975 as a Progressive Conservative member. He was first elected in the general election in 1955 and was re-elected in the elections in 1959, 1963, 1967, and 1971. He retired from politics in 1975. He was a farmer, by profession, and he was married to Isabel Keuhl (1926–2006). Hamilton is buried in the Calvin United Church & First Presbyterian Cemetery, Laurentian Valley, Renfrew, Ontario.

He died in a canoeing accident in 1976.

References

External links 
 

1923 births
1976 deaths
Progressive Conservative Party of Ontario MPPs